Harrington is an unincorporated community in Colusa County, California. It lies at an elevation of 131 feet (40 m).

References

Unincorporated communities in California
Unincorporated communities in Colusa County, California